Charlotte Petri Gornitzka is a Swedish management consultant and public administrator who has been serving as Assistant Secretary-General of the United Nations and as deputy executive director of the United Nations Children’s Fund (UNICEF) since 2018. She previously chaired the Development Assistance Committee (DAC) of the OECD from 2016 until 2018.

Early life and education
Petri Gornitzka has a background in management consulting with a focus on change management and communications. She holds a master's degree from Stockholm University College of Music Education (SMI) as well as a degree in Business and Marketing studies from IHM Business School.

Career
From 1998-2002, Petri Gornitzka  served as Under Secretary-General and Director of Communications for the Swedish Red Cross.

Petri Gornitzka later served as Secretary-General of Save the Children International (2008–2010) in London and Secretary-General of Save the Children Sweden (2003–2008).

Petri Gornitzka joined the Swedish public service and worked as Director-General of the Swedish International Development Cooperation Agency (SIDA) between 2010 and 2016. During that time, she became the initiator of “Swedish Leadership for Sustainable Development”, a network of some twenty leading Swedish companies, three expert organizations and SIDA, working for sustainable development with the objective to reduce poverty.

In 2016, Petri Gornitzka took over from Erik Solheim as chair of the DAC. The country that nominates a Chair for the Committee also agrees to finance the position, and on 16 February 2018, Dagens Nyheter reported that Sweden's cost for this chairmanship was 12.4 million SEK (1.254 million EUR, 1.556 million USD).

Other activities
 World Economic Forum Global Future Council on the Future of International Governance, Public-Private Co-operation and Sustainable Development, Co-chair  
 Stewardship Board for Economic Growth and Social Inclusion, Member
 2030 Water Resources Group, Member of the Governing Council.
 Global Challenges Foundation, Member of the Board

References

Stockholm University alumni
21st-century Swedish economists
Swedish women economists
Living people
Year of birth missing (living people)